William Cumming Henley (6 January 1860 – 6 November 1919) was a self-taught scientist, artist and collector who was born, educated and died in Dartmouth, Devon in England, and whose lifetime collection of artefacts is held in the Dartmouth Museum.

Henley is the subject of a biography, William Cumming Henley: His days and ways.

References

English scientists
English collectors
People from Dartmouth, Devon
1919 deaths
1860 births